William F. Sommerfield (January 19, 1877 – January 31, 1937) was an American businessman and politician.

Born in the town of Metomen, Fond du Lac County, Wisconsin, Sommerfield lived in Oakfield, Wisconsin; he was in the furniture and funeral home business. Sommerfield served as president of the village of Oakfield and was a Republican. He also served on the Fond du Lac County Board of Supervisors. In 1913, Sommerfield served in the Wisconsin State Assembly. Sommerfield died in Oakfield, Wisconsin.

Notes

1877 births
1937 deaths
People from Oakfield, Wisconsin
Businesspeople from Wisconsin
County supervisors in Wisconsin
Mayors of places in Wisconsin
Republican Party members of the Wisconsin State Assembly